Tommy Songo (born 20 April 1995) is a Liberian footballer who plays for LISCR as a goalkeeper.

Career
Born in Monrovia, Songo plays for LISCR.

He made his international debut for Liberia in 2015.

References

1995 births
Living people
Liberian footballers
Liberia international footballers
LISCR FC players
Association football goalkeepers